Otto Lowenstern (7 December 1888 – 1 December 1917) was an Australian rules footballer who played with St Kilda in the Victorian Football League (VFL).

Lowenstern spent both the 1910 and 1911 seasons playing in the VFL. He only appeared once in 1910 but played 11 games in 1911 under coach Eddie Drohan.

He fought in World War I, with the Lord Strathcona's Horse (Royal Canadians) regiment of the Royal Canadian Armoured Corps. Lowenstern was killed while fighting in France on 1 December 1917 and is buried at Vimy Memorial at Pas-de-Calais.

See also
 List of Victorian Football League players who died on active service

References

1888 births
1917 deaths
St Kilda Football Club players
Australian rules footballers from Melbourne
Canadian military personnel killed in World War I
Canadian Expeditionary Force soldiers
Lord Strathcona's Horse soldiers
Australian emigrants to Canada
People from Dandenong, Victoria